Stijn Steels (born 21 August 1989 in Ghent) is a Belgian former cyclist, who competed as a professional from 2010 to 2022. He is the nephew of former professional cyclist Tom Steels.

Major results

2010
 2nd Dwars door het Hageland
 4th Grote Prijs Stad Geel
2011
 9th Overall Ronde de l'Isard
2012
 4th Flèche Ardennaise
2013
 3rd Antwerpse Havenpijl
 6th Rund um Köln
2014
 1st  Sprints classification Three Days of De Panne
 7th Polynormande
2015
 1st Dwars door de Vlaamse Ardennen
2016
 1st Grand Prix de la Ville de Lillers
 3rd Schaal Sels
2017
 8th Schaal Sels
2019
 6th Memorial Rik Van Steenbergen

References

External links

1989 births
Living people
Belgian male cyclists
Sportspeople from Ghent
Cyclists from East Flanders